Nima Rahizadeh (born 28 August 2001 in Bandar Abbas, Iran) is a professional Iranian basketball player. He last played for the Foolad Hormozgan club of the Iranian Basketball Super League. He also played for the Iranian national basketball team, as a Shooting guard.

Honours

National team 

 WABA Champions Cup
 Gold medal: 2017, 2018

Club 

 Iranian Super League
 Champions: 2017, 2018, 2019 (Sahrdari)

References

External links 

 Nima Rahizadeh on FIBA Archive
 Nima Rahizadeh on FIBA Basketball
 Nima Rahizadeh on IRIBF
 Nima Rahizadeh at Eurobasket

Living people
2001 births
Iranian men's basketball players
Asian Games medalists in basketball
Power forwards (basketball)
Sanaye Hormozgan BC players
People from Hormozgan Province